The 1958–59 Yugoslav Cup was the 12th season of the top football knockout competition in SFR Yugoslavia, the Yugoslav Cup, also known as the "Marshal Tito Cup" (Kup Maršala Tita), since its establishment in 1946.

First round
In the following tables winning teams are marked in bold; teams from outside top level are marked in italic script.

Second round

Quarter-finals

Semi-finals

Final

See also
1958–59 Yugoslav First League
1958–59 Yugoslav Second League

External links
1958–59 Yugoslav Cup details at Rec.Sport.Soccer Statistics Foundation

Yugoslav Cup seasons
Cup
Yugo